Blythophryne is currently a monotypic genus of true toads. The sole species Blythophryne beryet is described from the Andaman Islands, in the Bay of Bengal, India.

Description

Blythophryne is distinguished from other bufonid genera because of its small adult size. Osteology: Presence of six presacral vertebrae, absence of coccygeal expansions. General Anatomy: Have elongated pair of parotoid glands, expanded discs at digit tips, phytotelmonous tadpoles lack oral denticles and have keratinised jaw sheaths.

Species
There is only 1 species recorded:

References

Amphibians of India
Bufonidae
Amphibians described in 2016